The School District of Manatee County, in Manatee County, Florida, provides education to over 50,000 students. It employs over 7,000 people.

The School District is managed by the Manatee County School Board and the Superintendent. Cynthia Saunders is the current Superintendent of Schools. Current Manatee County School Board members are Gina Messenger, District 1; Charlie Kennedy, District 2; Mary Foreman, District 3; Chad Choate, District 4; and Rev. James Golden, District 5.

As of June 2019, SDMC has achieved an overall ranking of “B,” according to the Florida Department of Education's school grade system, which is based on the New Florida Standards and Florida Standard Assessments (FSA) test results.

Senior Leadership

School Board of Manatee County
The district's administrative offices are primarily located in Bradenton, Florida at 215 Manatee Avenue West. The School District of Manatee County is governed by the School Board of Manatee County, a body of five elected officers, each board member representing a particular geographic area. The current School Board members, in order of district number, are: Gina Messenger, Charlie Kennedy, Mary Foreman, Chad Choate, and Rev. James Golden. Board members are elected every four years, with Districts 2, 4, 5 elected during midterm election cycles (next in 2022) and Districts 1, 3 elected during presidential cycles (next in 2020).

Superintendent
Mrs. Cynthia Saunders was sworn in as Superintendent of the School District of Manatee County on June 28, 2018, following the departure of former Superintendent Dr. Diana Greene, who was named Superintendent of Duval County Public Schools.

On February 12, 2019, the School Board approved a contract to retain Mrs. Saunders as the full-time Superintendent moving forward. Board members cited her performance as Superintendent during the previous seven months, her in-depth knowledge of issues confronting the school district and the fact that her leadership would bring a sense of stability to the district as strong reasons for her continued service.

Controversy: Cynthia Saunders was under investigation by the Florida Department of Education Office of Professional Practices for inflating district graduation rates and was cited with sanctions on her certificate.

Schools

High schools
Bayshore (Bruin)
Braden River High School (Pirate)
Lakewood Ranch (Mustang)
Manatee (Hurricane)
Palmetto (Tiger)
Parrish Community High School (Bull)
Southeast (Seminole)

Middle schools
Braden River Middle School
Buffalo Creek Middle School
Carlos E. Haile Middle School
Sara Scott Harllee Middle School
Dr. Mona Jain Middle School
Louise R. Johnson Middle School
Martha B. King Middle School
Electa Arcott Lee Middle School
Lincoln Memorial Middle School
R. Dan Nolan Middle School
W. D. Sugg Middle School

Elementary schools
Florine J. Abel Elementary School
Anna Maria Elementary School
Ballard Elementary School
William H. Bashaw Elementary School
Bayshore Elementary School
Blackburn Elementary School
Braden River Elementary School
Blanche H. Daughtrey Elementary School
Duette Elementary School
Freedom Elementary School
B. D. Gullett Elementary School
Barbara A. Harvey Elementary School
Marjorie G. Kinnan Elementary School
Manatee Elementary School
Gilbert W. McNeal Elementary School
Jessie P. Miller Elementary School
Virgil Mills Elementary School
H. S. Moody Elementary School
Myakka City Elementary School
Oneco Elementary School
Orange Ridge / Bullock Elementary School
Palm View Elementary School
Palma Sola Elementary School
Palmetto Elementary School
Robert H. Prine Elementary School
William Monroe Rowlett Elementary School
G. D. Rogers Garden Elementary School
Samoset Elementary Accelerated School
Sea Breeze Elementary School
Ida M. Stewart Elementary School
Tara Elementary School
James Tillman Elementary School
Frances Wakeland Elementary School
Annie Lucy Williams Elementary School
Gene Witt Elementary School
Robert E. Willis Elementary School

Charter schools 
 Manatee School for the Arts
 State College of Florida Collegiate School

References

External links
 School District of Manatee County

Education in Manatee County, Florida
Manatee
Bradenton, Florida
Manatee County, Florida